Lisbon is the capital and largest city of Portugal, with an estimated population of 544,851 within its administrative limits in an area of 100.05 km2. Lisbon's urban area extends beyond the city's administrative limits with a population of around 2.7 million people, being the 11th-most populous urban area in the European Union. About 3 million people live in the Lisbon metropolitan area, making it the third largest metropolitan area in the Iberian Peninsula, after Madrid and Barcelona. It represents approximately 27% of the country's population. It is mainland Europe's westernmost capital city and the only one along the Atlantic coast. Lisbon lies in the western Iberian Peninsula on the Atlantic Ocean and the River Tagus. The westernmost portions of its metro area, the Portuguese Riviera, form the westernmost point of Continental Europe, culminating at Cabo da Roca.

Lisbon is recognised as an alpha-level global city because of its importance in finance, commerce, fashion, media, entertainment, arts, international trade, education and tourism. Lisbon is one of two Portuguese cities (alongside Porto) to be recognised as a global city. Lisbon is home to three companies in the Global 2000. It is one of the major economic centres in Europe, with a growing financial sector and one of the largest container ports on Europe's Atlantic coast. Additionally, Humberto Delgado Airport served 31 million passengers in 2019, being the busiest airport in Portugal, the third busiest in the Iberian Peninsula and the 20th busiest in Europe. The motorway network and the high-speed rail system of Alfa Pendular link the main cities of Portugal to Lisbon. The city is the ninth-most-visited city in Southern Europe, after Istanbul, Rome, Barcelona, Milan, Athens, Venice, Madrid and Florence with 3,539,400 tourists in 2018. The Lisbon region has a higher GDP PPP per capita than any other region in Portugal. Its GDP amounts to US$110.3 billion and thus $39,434 per capita. The city occupies the 40th place of highest gross earnings in the world. Most of the headquarters of multinational corporations in Portugal are located in the Lisbon area. It is also the political centre of the country, as its seat of government and residence of the head of state.

Lisbon is one of the oldest cities in the world and the second-oldest European capital city (after Athens), predating other modern European capitals by centuries. Julius Caesar made it a municipium called Felicitas Julia, adding to the name Olissipo. After the fall of the Roman Empire it was ruled by a series of Germanic tribes from the 5th century; later it was captured by the Moors in the 8th century. In 1147 Afonso Henriques conquered the city and since then it has been the political, economic and cultural centre of Portugal.

Etymology

Lisbon's name may have been derived from Proto-Celtic or Celtic Olisippo, Lissoppo, or a similar name which other visiting peoples like the ancient Phoenicians, Greeks and Romans adapted accordingly, such as the pre-Roman appellation for the Tagus River, Lisso or Lucio. Classical authors writing in Latin and Greek, including Strabo, Solinus, and Martianus Capella, referred to popular legends that the city of Lisbon was founded by the mythical hero Ulysses (Odysseus). Lisbon's name was written Ulyssippo in Latin by the geographer Pomponius Mela, a native of Hispania. It was later referred to as "Olisippo" by Pliny the Elder and by the Greeks as Olissipo (Ὀλισσιπών) or Olissipona (Ὀλισσιπόνα).

Another claim repeated in literature is that the name of Lisbon could be traced back to Phoenician times, referring to a supposed Phoenician term Alis-Ubbo, meaning "safe harbour" or "pleasant haven". Although modern archaeological excavations show a Phoenician presence at this location since 1200BC, this folk etymology "is never attested in ancient classical literature".

Lisbon's name is commonly abbreviated as "LX" or "Lx", originating in an antiquated spelling of Lisbon as ‘‘Lixbõa’’. While the old spelling has since been completely dropped from usage and goes against modern language standards, the abbreviation is still commonly used.

History

Origins

During the Neolithic period, the region was inhabited by Pre-Celtic tribes, who built religious and funerary monuments, megaliths, dolmens and menhirs, which still survive in areas on the periphery of Lisbon. The Indo-European Celts invaded in the 1st millennium BC, mixing with the Pre-Indo-European population, thus giving rise to Celtic-speaking local tribes such as the Cempsi or Sefes.

Although the first fortifications on Lisbon's Castelo hill are known to be no older than the 2nd century BC, recent archaeological finds have shown that Iron Age people occupied the site from the 8th to 6th centuries BC. This indigenous settlement maintained commercial relations with the Phoenicians, which would account for the recent findings of Phoenician pottery and other material objects. Archaeological excavations made near the Castle of São Jorge (Castelo de São Jorge) and Lisbon Cathedral indicate a Phoenician presence at this location since 1200 BC, and it can be stated with confidence that a Phoenician trading post stood on a site now the centre of the present city, on the southern slope of Castle hill. The sheltered harbour in the Tagus River estuary was an ideal spot for an Iberian settlement and would have provided a secure harbour for unloading and provisioning Phoenician ships. The Tagus settlement was an important centre of commercial trade with the inland tribes, providing an outlet for the valuable metals, salt and salted-fish they collected, and for the sale of the Lusitanian horses renowned in antiquity.

According to a persistent legend, the location was named for the mythical Ulysses, who founded the city when he sailed westward to the ends of the known world.

Roman era

Following the defeat of Hannibal in 202 BC during the Punic wars, the Romans determined to deprive Carthage of its most valuable possession: Hispania (the Iberian Peninsula). The defeat of Carthaginian forces by Scipio Africanus in Eastern Hispania allowed the pacification of the west, led by Consul Decimus Junius Brutus Callaicus. Decimus obtained the alliance of Olissipo (which sent men to fight alongside the Roman Legions against the northwestern Celtic tribes) by integrating it into the empire, as the Municipium Cives Romanorum Felicitas Julia. Local authorities were granted self-rule over a territory that extended ; exempt from taxes, its citizens were given the privileges of Roman citizenship, and it was then integrated with the Roman province of Lusitania (whose capital was Emerita Augusta).

Lusitanian raids and rebellions during Roman occupation required the construction of a wall around the settlement. During Augustus' reign, the Romans also built a great theatre; the Cassian Baths (underneath Rua da Prata); temples to Jupiter, Diana, Cybele, Tethys and Idea Phrygiae (an uncommon cult from Asia Minor), in addition to temples to the Emperor; a large necropolis under Praça da Figueira; a large forum and other buildings such as insulae (multi-storied apartment buildings) in the area between Castle Hill and the historic city core. Many of these ruins were first unearthed during the mid-18th century (when the recent discovery of Pompeii made Roman archaeology fashionable among Europe's upper classes).

The city prospered as piracy was eliminated and technological advances were introduced, consequently Felicitas Julia became a center of trade with the Roman provinces of Britannia (particularly Cornwall) and the Rhine. Economically strong, Olissipo was known for its garum (a fish sauce highly prized by the elites of the empire and exported in amphorae to Rome), wine, salt, and horse-breeding, while Roman culture permeated the hinterland. The city was connected by a broad road to Western Hispania's two other large cities, Bracara Augusta in the province of Tarraconensis (Portuguese Braga), and Emerita Augusta, the capital of Lusitania. The city was ruled by an oligarchical council dominated by two families, the Julii and the Cassiae, although regional authority was administered by the Roman Governor of Emerita or directly by Emperor Tiberius. Among the majority of Latin speakers lived a large minority of Greek traders and slaves.

Olissipo, like most great cities in the Western Empire, was a center for the dissemination of Christianity. Its first attested Bishop was Potamius (c. 356), and there were several martyrs during the period of persecution of the Christians: Verissimus, Maxima, and Julia are the most significant examples. By the time of the Fall of Rome, Olissipo had become a notable Christian center.

Middle Ages

Following the disintegration of the Western Roman Empire, there were barbarian invasions; between 409 and 429 the city was occupied successively by Sarmatians, Alans and Vandals. The Germanic Suebi, who established a kingdom in Gallaecia (modern Galicia and northern Portugal), with its capital in Bracara Augusta, also controlled the region of Lisbon until 585. In 585, the Suebi Kingdom was integrated into the Germanic Visigothic Kingdom of Toledo, which comprised all of the Iberian Peninsula: Lisbon was then called Ulishbona.

On 6 August 711, Lisbon was taken by Muslim forces. These conquerors, who were mostly Berbers and some Arabs from North Africa and the Middle East, built many mosques and houses, rebuilt the city wall (known as the Cerca Moura) and established administrative control, while permitting the diverse population (Muwallad, Mozarabs, Berbers, Arabs, Jews, and Saqaliba) to maintain their socio-cultural lifestyles. Mozarabic was the native language spoken by most of the Christian population although Arabic was widely known as spoken by all religious communities. Islam was the official religion practised by the Arabs, Berbers, Saqaliba and Muwallad.

The Muslim influence is still visible in the Alfama district, an old quarter of Lisbon that survived the 1755 Lisbon earthquake: many place-names are derived from Arabic and the Alfama (the oldest existing district of Lisbon) was derived from the Arabic "al-hamma.

For a brief time, Lisbon was an independent Muslim kingdom known as the Taifa of Lisbon (1022–1094), before being conquered by the larger Taifa of Badajoz.

In 1108 Lisbon was raided and occupied by Norwegian crusaders led by Sigurd I on their way to the Holy Land as part of the Norwegian Crusade and occupied by crusader forces for three years. It was taken by the Moorish Almoravids in 1111.

In 1147, as part of the Reconquista, crusader knights led by Afonso I of Portugal besieged and reconquered Lisbon. The city, with around 154,000 residents at the time, was returned to Christian rule. The reconquest of Portugal and re-establishment of Christianity is one of the most significant events in Lisbon's history, described in the chronicle Expugnatione Lyxbonensi, which describes, among other incidents, how the local bishop was killed by the crusaders and the city's residents prayed to the Virgin Mary as it happened. Some of the Muslim residents converted to Roman Catholicism and most of those who did not convert fled to other parts of the Islamic world, primarily Muslim Spain and North Africa. All mosques were either completely destroyed or converted into churches. As a result of the end of Muslim rule, spoken Arabic quickly lost its place in the everyday life of the city and disappeared altogether.

With its central location, Lisbon became the capital city of the new Portuguese territory in 1255.
The first Portuguese university was founded in Lisbon in 1290 by King Denis I; for many years the Studium Generale (General Study) was transferred intermittently to Coimbra, where it was installed permanently in the 16th century as the University of Coimbra.

In 1384, the city was besieged by King Juan I of Castille, as a part of the ongoing 1383–1385 Crisis. The result of the siege was a victory for the Portuguese led by Nuno Álvares Pereira.

During the last centuries of the Middle Ages, the city expanded substantially and became an important trading post with both Northern European and Mediterranean cities.

Early Modern

When the Spaniards expelled the Jews from Spanish territory, many of the Jews fled to Lisbon. Although acknowledging the central importance of the Jews to the city's prosperity, Manuel I decreed in 1497 that all Jews must convert to Christianity, only those who refused being forced to leave, but not before the expropriation of their property. In 1506, an anti-semitic movement among the Old Christians of Lisbon culminated in a massacre lasting four days in which some 1,000 to 4,000 New Christian men, women and children, converted descendants of Sephardic Jews, are estimated to have been killed. The king was at Évora when these events occurred, but angered when he received the news, he ordered an investigation which resulted in two of the instigating friars being excommunicated and burned alive.

Most of the Portuguese expeditions of the Age of Discovery left Lisbon during the period from the end of the 15th century to the beginning of the 17th century, including Vasco da Gama's expedition to India in 1498. The following years of the 16th century began Lisbon's golden era: the city was the European hub of commerce between Africa, India, the Far East and later, Brazil, and acquired great riches by exploiting the trade in spices, slaves, sugar, textiles and other goods. This period saw the rise of the exuberant Manueline style in architecture, which left its mark in many 16th-century monuments (including Lisbon's Belém Tower and Jerónimos Monastery, which were declared UNESCO World Heritage Sites). A description of Lisbon in the 16th century was written by Damião de Góis and published in 1554.

The succession crisis of 1580, initiated a sixty-year period of dual monarchy in Portugal and Spain under the Spanish Habsburgs. This is referred to as the "Philippine Dominion" (Domínio Filipino), since all three Spanish kings during that period were called Philip (Filipe). In 1589, Lisbon was the target of an incursion by the English Armada led by Francis Drake, while Queen Elizabeth supported a Portuguese pretender in Antonio, Prior of Crato, but support for Crato was lacking and the expedition was a failure. The Portuguese Restoration War, which began with a coup d'état organised by the nobility and bourgeoisie in Lisbon and executed on 1 December 1640, restored Portuguese independence. The period from 1640 to 1668 was marked by periodic skirmishes between Portugal and Spain, as well as short episodes of more serious warfare until the Treaty of Lisbon was signed in 1668.

In the early 18th century, gold from Brazil allowed King John V to sponsor the building of several Baroque churches and theatres in the city. Prior to the 18th century, Lisbon had experienced several significant earthquakes – eight in the 14th century, five in the 16th century (including the 1531 earthquake that destroyed 1,500 houses and the 1597 earthquake in which three streets vanished), and three in the 17th century.

On 1 November 1755, the city was destroyed by another devastating earthquake, which killed an estimated 30,000 to 40,000 Lisbon residents of a population estimated at between 200,000 and 275,000, and destroyed 85 percent of the city's structures. Among several important buildings of the city, the Ribeira Palace and the Hospital Real de Todos os Santos were lost.

By 1755, Lisbon was one of the largest cities in Europe; the catastrophic event shocked the whole of Europe and left a deep impression on its collective psyche. Voltaire wrote a long poem, Poême sur le désastre de Lisbonne, shortly after the quake, and mentioned it in his 1759 novel Candide (indeed, many argue that this critique of optimism was inspired by that earthquake). Oliver Wendell Holmes, Sr. also mentions it in his 1857 poem, The Deacon's Masterpiece, or The Wonderful One-Hoss Shay.

After the 1755 earthquake, the city was rebuilt largely according to the plans of Prime Minister Sebastião José de Carvalho e Melo, the 1st Marquis of Pombal; the lower town began to be known as the Baixa Pombalina (Pombaline central district). Instead of rebuilding the medieval town, Pombal decided to demolish what remained after the earthquake and rebuild the city centre in accordance with principles of modern urban design. It was reconstructed in an open rectangular plan with two great squares: the Praça do Rossio and the Praça do Comércio. The first, the central commercial district, is the traditional gathering place of the city and the location of the older cafés, theatres and restaurants; the second became the city's main access to the River Tagus and point of departure and arrival for seagoing vessels, adorned by a triumphal arch (1873) and a monument to King Joseph I.

Modern era

In the first years of the 19th century, Portugal was invaded by the troops of Napoléon Bonaparte, forcing Queen Maria I and Prince-Regent John (future John VI) to flee temporarily to Brazil. By the time the new King returned to Lisbon, many of the buildings and properties were pillaged, sacked or destroyed by the invaders.

During the 19th century, the Liberal movement introduced new changes into the urban landscape. The principal areas were in the Baixa and along the Chiado district, where shops, tobacconists shops, cafés, bookstores, clubs and theatres proliferated. The development of industry and commerce determined the growth of the city, seeing the transformation of the Passeio Público, a Pombaline era park, into the Avenida da Liberdade, as the city grew farther from the Tagus.

Lisbon was the site of the regicide of Carlos I of Portugal in 1908, an event which culminated two years later in the establishment of the First Republic.

The city refounded its university in 1911 after centuries of inactivity in Lisbon, incorporating reformed former colleges and other non-university higher education schools of the city (such as the Escola Politécnica – now Faculdade de Ciências). Today there are two public universities in the city (University of Lisbon and New University of Lisbon), a public university institute (ISCTE - Lisbon University Institute) and a polytechnic institute (IPL – Instituto Politécnico de Lisboa).

During World War II, Lisbon was one of the very few neutral, open European Atlantic ports, a major gateway for refugees to the U.S. and a haven for spies. More than 100,000 refugees were able to flee Nazi Germany via Lisbon.

During the Estado Novo regime (1926–1974), Lisbon was expanded at the cost of other districts within the country, resulting in nationalist and monumental projects. New residential and public developments were constructed; the zone of Belém was modified for the 1940 Portuguese Exhibition, while along the periphery new districts appeared to house the growing population. The inauguration of the bridge over the Tagus allowed a rapid connection between both sides of the river.

Lisbon was the site of three revolutions in the 20th century. The first, the 5 October 1910 revolution, brought an end to the Portuguese monarchy and established the highly unstable and corrupt Portuguese First Republic. The 6 June 1926 revolution ended the first republic and firmly established the Estado Novo, or the Portuguese Second Republic, as the ruling regime.

Contemporary

The Carnation Revolution, which took place on 25 April 1974, ended the right-wing Estado Novo regime and reformed the country to become as it is today, the Portuguese Third Republic.

In the 1990s, many of the districts were renovated and projects in the historic quarters were established to modernise those areas, for instance, architectural and patrimonial buildings were renovated, the northern margin of the Tagus was re-purposed for leisure and residential use, the Vasco da Gama Bridge was constructed and the eastern part of the municipality was re-purposed for Expo '98 to commemorate the 500th anniversary of Vasco da Gama's sea voyage to India, a voyage that would bring immense riches to Lisbon and cause many of Lisbon's landmarks to be built.

In 1988, a fire in the historical district of Chiado saw the destruction of many 18th-century Pombaline style buildings. A series of restoration works has brought the area back to its former self and made it a high-scale shopping district.

The Lisbon Agenda was a European Union agreement on measures to revitalise the EU economy, signed in Lisbon in March 2000. In October 2007 Lisbon hosted the 2007 EU Summit, where an agreement was reached regarding a new EU governance model. The resulting Treaty of Lisbon was signed on 13 December 2007 and came into force on 1 December 2009.

Lisbon has been the site for many international events and programmes. In 1994, Lisbon was the European Capital of Culture. On 3 November 2005, Lisbon hosted the MTV European Music Awards. On 7 July 2007, Lisbon held the ceremony of the "New 7 Wonders Of The World" election, in the Luz Stadium, with live transmission for millions of people all over the world. Every two years, Lisbon hosts the Rock in Rio Lisboa Music Festival, one of the largest in the world. Lisbon hosted the NATO summit (19–20 November 2010), a summit meeting that is regarded as a periodic opportunity for Heads of State and Heads of Government of NATO member states to evaluate and provide strategic direction for Alliance activities. The city hosts the Web Summit and is the head office for the Group of Seven Plus (G7+). In 2018 it hosted the Eurovision Song Contest for the first time as well as the Michelin Gala. On 11 July 2018, the Aga Khan officially chose the Henrique de Mendonça Palace, located on Rua Marquês de Fronteira, as the Divan, or seat, of the global Nizari Muslim Imamate.

Geography

Physical geography

The westernmost part of Lisbon is occupied by the Monsanto Forest Park, a  urban park, one of the largest in Europe, and occupying 10% of the municipality.

The rest of the urbanised area of the Lisbon urban area, known generically as Greater Lisbon includes several administratively defined cities and municipalities, in the north bank of the Tagus River. The larger Lisbon metropolitan area includes the Setúbal Peninsula to the south.

Climate

Lisbon has a Mediterranean climate (Köppen: Csa) with mild, rainy winters and warm to hot, dry summers.
 

The city has around 2,806 hours of sunshine per year, averaging 4.6 hours of sunshine per day in December and 11.4 hours of sunshine per day in July, though when disregarding the duration of the day August is actually the sunniest, with over 80% chance of direct sunlight hitting the ground. 

November and December are the wettest months, accounting for a third of the total annual precipitation. July and August are the driest.

Freguesias
The municipality of Lisbon included 53 freguesias until November 2012. A new law ("Lei n.º 56/2012") reduced the number of freguesias to the following 24:

Ajuda
Alcântara
Alvalade
Areeiro
Arroios
Avenidas Novas
Beato
Belém
Benfica
Campo de Ourique
Campolide
Carnide
Estrela
Lumiar
Marvila
Misericórdia
Olivais
Parque das Nações
Penha de França
Santa Clara
Santa Maria Maior
Santo António
São Domingos de Benfica
São Vicente

Neighborhoods

Locally, Lisbon's inhabitants may commonly refer to the spaces of Lisbon in terms of historic Bairros de Lisboa (neighbourhoods). These communities have no clearly defined boundaries and represent distinctive quarters of the city that have in common a historical culture, similar living standards, and identifiable architectural landmarks, as exemplified by the Bairro Alto, Alfama, Chiado, and so forth.

Alcântara

Although today it is quite central, it was once a mere suburb of Lisbon, comprising mostly farms and country estates of the nobility with their palaces. In the 16th century, there was a brook there which the nobles used to promenade in their boats. During the late 19th century, Alcântara became a popular industrial area, with many small factories and warehouses.

In the early 1990s, Alcântara began to attract youth because of the number of pubs and discothèques. This was mainly due to its outer area of mostly commercial buildings, which acted as barriers to the noise-generating nightlife (which acted as a buffer to the residential communities surrounding it). In the meantime, some of these areas began to become gentrified, attracting loft developments and new flats, which have profited from its river views and central location.

The riverfront of Alcântara is known for its nightclubs and bars. The area is commonly known as docas (docks), since most of the clubs and bars are housed in converted dock warehouses.

Alfama

The oldest district of Lisbon, it spreads down the southern slope from the Castle of São Jorge to the River Tagus. Its name, derived from the Arabic Al-hamma, means fountains or baths. During the Islamic invasion of Iberia, the Alfama constituted the largest part of the city, extending west to the Baixa neighbourhood. Increasingly, the Alfama became inhabited by fishermen and the poor: its fame as a poor neighbourhood continues to this day. While the 1755 Lisbon earthquake caused considerable damage throughout the capital, the Alfama survived with little damage, thanks to its compact labyrinth of narrow streets and small squares.

It is a historical quarter of mixed-use buildings occupied by Fado bars, restaurants, and homes with small shops downstairs. Modernising trends have invigorated the district: old houses have been re-purposed or remodelled, while new buildings have been constructed. Fado, the typically Portuguese style of melancholy music, is common (but not obligatory) in the restaurants of the district.

Mouraria
The Mouraria, or Moorish quarter, is one of the most traditional neighbourhoods of Lisbon, although most of its old buildings were demolished by the Estado Novo between the 1930s and the 1970s. It takes its name from the fact that after the reconquest of Lisbon, the Muslims who remained were confined to this part of the city. In turn, the Jews were confined to three neighbourhoods called "Judiarias".

Bairro Alto

Bairro Alto (literally the upper quarter in Portuguese) is an area of central Lisbon that functions as a residential, shopping and entertainment district; it is the center of the Portuguese capital's nightlife, attracting hipster youth and members of various music subcultures. Lisbon's punk, gay, metal, goth, hip hop and reggae scenes all find a home in the Bairro with its many clubs and bars that cater to them. The crowds in the Bairro Alto are a multicultural mix of people representing a broad cross-section of modern Portuguese society, many of them being entertainment seekers and devotees of various music genres outside the mainstream, Fado, Portugal's national music, still survives in the midst of the new nightlife.

Baixa

The heart of the city is the Baixa or city centre; the Pombaline Baixa is an elegant district, primarily constructed after the 1755 Lisbon earthquake, taking its name from its benefactor, Sebastião José de Carvalho e Melo, 1st Marquis of Pombal, who was the minister of Joseph I of Portugal (1750–1777) and a key figure during the Portuguese Enlightenment. Following the 1755 disaster, Pombal took the lead in rebuilding Lisbon, imposing strict conditions and guidelines on the construction of the city, and transforming the organic street plan that characterised the district before the earthquake into its current grid pattern. As a result, the Pombaline Baixa is one of the first examples of earthquake-resistant construction. Architectural models were tested by having troops march around them to simulate an earthquake. Notable features of Pombaline structures include the Pombaline cage, a symmetrical wood-lattice framework aimed at distributing earthquake forces, and inter-terrace walls that were built higher than roof timbers to inhibit the spread of fires.

Beato

The parish of Beato stands out for the new cultural dynamics it has been experiencing in recent years. The manufacturing districts and the industrial facilities by the riverside docks are the place of choice for contemporary art galleries, iconic bars, and gourmet restaurants that simmer in the streets. This reality has not gone unnoticed by the national press, and Visão, TimeOut, or Jornal de Negócios have already made notice of this parish that hides treasures such as the National Museum of the Azulejo or the Palacio do Grilo.

Belém

Belém is famous as the place from which many of the great Portuguese explorers set off on their voyages of discovery. In particular, it is the place from which Vasco da Gama departed for India in 1497 and Pedro Álvares Cabral departed for Brazil in 1499. It is also a former royal residence and features the 17th – 18th-century Belém Palace, a former royal residence now occupied by the President of Portugal, and the Ajuda Palace, begun in 1802 but never completed.

Perhaps Belém's most famous feature is its tower, Torre de Belém, whose image is much used by Lisbon's tourist board. The tower was built as a fortified lighthouse late in the reign of Dom Manuel l (1515–1520) to guard the entrance to the port. It stood on a little island on the right side of the Tagus, surrounded by water. Belém's other major historical building is the Mosteiro dos Jerónimos (Jerónimos Monastery), which the Torre de Belém was built partly to defend. Belém's most notable modern feature is the Padrão dos Descobrimentos (Monument to the Discoveries) built for the Portuguese World Fair in 1940. In the heart of Belém is the Praça do Império: gardens centred upon a large fountain, laid out during World War II. To the west of the gardens lies the Centro Cultural de Belém. Belém is one of the most visited Lisbon districts. Here is located the Estádio do Restelo, home to Belenenses.

Chiado

The Chiado is a traditional shopping area that mixes old and modern commercial establishments, concentrated specially in the Rua do Carmo and the Rua Garrett. Locals as well as tourists visit the Chiado to buy books, clothing and pottery as well as to have a cup of coffee. The most famous café of Chiado is A Brasileira, famous for having had poet Fernando Pessoa among its customers. The Chiado is also an important cultural area, with several museums and theatres, including the opera. Several buildings of the Chiado were destroyed in a fire in 1988, an event that deeply shocked the country. Thanks to a renovation project that lasted more than 10 years, coordinated by celebrated architect Siza Vieira, the affected area has now virtually recovered.

Estrela

The ornate, late 18th-century Estrela Basilica is the main attraction of this district. The church with its large dome is located on a hill in what was at the time the western part of Lisbon and can be seen from great distances. The style is similar to that of the Mafra National Palace, late baroque and neoclassical. The façade has twin bell towers and includes statues of saints and some allegorical figures. São Bento Palace, the seat of the Portuguese parliament and the official residences of the Prime Minister of Portugal and the President of the Assembly of the Republic of Portugal, are in this district. Also in this district is Estrela Park, a favorite with families. There are exotic plants and trees, a duck pond, various sculptures, a children's playground, and many cultural events going on throughout the year, including outdoor cinema, markets, and music festivals.

Parque das Nações

Parque das Nações (Park of Nations) is the newest district in Lisbon; it emerged from an urban renewal program to host the 1998 World Exhibition of Lisbon, also known as Expo'98. The area suffered massive changes giving Parque das Nações a futuristic look. A long-lasting legacy of the same, the area has become another commercial and higher-end residential area for the city.

Central in the area is the Gare do Oriente (Orient railway station), one of the main transport hubs of Lisbon for trains, buses, taxis, and the metro. Its glass and steel columns are inspired by Gothic architecture, lending the whole structure a visual fascination (especially in sunlight or when illuminated at night). It was designed by the architect Santiago Calatrava from Valencia, Spain. The Parque das Nações is across the street.

The area is pedestrian-friendly with new buildings, restaurants, gardens, the Casino Lisbon, the FIL building (International Exhibition and Fair), the Camões Theatre and the Oceanário de Lisboa (Lisbon Oceanarium), which is the second-largest in the world. The district's Altice Arena has become Lisbon's "jack-of-all-trades" performance arena. With seating for 20,000, it has staged events ranging from concerts to basketball tournaments.

Politics

Carlos Moedas took office as the 78th and current Mayor of Lisbon on 18 October 2021, following the 2021 local elections.

Local election results 1976–2021

Culture

The city of Lisbon is rich in architecture; Romanesque, Gothic, Manueline, Baroque, Modern and Postmodern constructions can be found all over Lisbon. The city is also crossed by historical boulevards and monuments along the main thoroughfares, particularly in the upper districts; notable among these are the Avenida da Liberdade (Avenue of Liberty), Avenida Fontes Pereira de Melo, Avenida Almirante Reis and Avenida da República (Avenue of the Republic).

Lisbon is home to numerous prominent museums and art collections, from all around the world. The National Museum of Ancient Art, which has one of the largest art collections in the world, and the National Coach Museum, which has the world's largest collection of royal coaches and carriages, are the two most visited museums in the city. Other notable national museums include the National Museum of Archaeology, the Museum of Lisbon, the National Azulejo Museum, the National Museum of Contemporary Art, and the National Museum of Natural History & Science.

Prominent private museums and galleries include the Gulbenkian Museum (run by the Calouste Gulbenkian Foundation, one of the wealthiest foundations in the world), which houses one of the largest private collections of antiquaries and art in the world, the Berardo Collection Museum, which houses the private collection of Portuguese billionaire Joe Berardo, the Museum of Art, Architecture and Technology, and the Museum of the Orient. Other popular museums include the Electricity Museum, the Ephemeral Museum, the Museu da Água, and the Museu Benfica, among many others.

Lisbon's Opera House, the Teatro Nacional de São Carlos, hosts a relatively active cultural agenda, mainly in autumn and winter. Other important theatres and musical houses are the Centro Cultural de Belém, the Teatro Nacional D. Maria II, the Gulbenkian Foundation, and the Teatro Camões.

The monument to Christ the King (Cristo-Rei) stands on the southern bank of the Tagus River, in Almada. With open arms, overlooking the whole city, it resembles the Corcovado monument in Rio de Janeiro, and was built after World War II, as a memorial of thanksgiving for Portugal's being spared the horrors and destruction of the war.

13 June is Lisbon´s holiday in honour of the city's saint, Anthony of Lisbon. Saint Anthony, also known as Saint Anthony of Padua, was a wealthy Portuguese bohemian who was canonised and made Doctor of the Church after a life preaching to the poor. Although Lisbon’s patron saint is Saint Vincent of Saragossa, whose remains are housed in the Sé Cathedral, there are no festivities associated with this saint.

Eduardo VII Park, the second-largest park in the city following the Parque Florestal de Monsanto (Monsanto Forest Park), extends down the main avenue (Avenida da Liberdade), with many flowering plants and green spaces, that includes the permanent collection of subtropical and tropical plants in the winter garden. Originally named Parque da Liberdade, it was renamed in honour of Edward VII who visited Lisbon in 1903.

Lisbon is home every year to the Lisbon Gay & Lesbian Film Festival, the Lisboarte, the DocLisboa – Lisbon International Documentary Film Festival, the Festival Internacional de Máscaras e Comediantes, the Lisboa Mágica – Street Magic World Festival, the Monstra – Animated Film Festival, the Lisbon Book Fair, the Peixe em Lisboa – Lisbon Fish and Flavours, and many others.

Lisbon has two sites listed by UNESCO as a World Heritage Site: Belém Tower and Jerónimos Monastery. Furthermore, in 1994, Lisbon was the European Capital of Culture and, in 1998, organised the Expo '98 (1998 Lisbon World Exposition).

Lisbon is also home to the Lisbon Architecture Triennial, the Moda Lisboa (Fashion Lisbon), ExperimentaDesign – Biennial of Design, and LuzBoa – Biennial of Light.

In addition, the mosaic Portuguese pavement (Calçada Portuguesa) was born in Lisbon, in the mid-1800s. The art has since spread to the rest of the Portuguese Speaking world. The city remains one of the most expansive examples of the technique, nearly all walkways and even many streets being created and maintained in this style.

In May 2018, the city hosted the 63rd edition of the Eurovision Song Contest, after the victory of Salvador Sobral with the song "Amar pelos dois" in Kyiv on 13 May 2017.

Demographics

The historical population of the city was around 35,000 in 1300 AD. Up to 60,000 in 1400 AD, and rising to 70,000 in 1500 AD. Between 1528 and 1590 the population went from 70,000 to 120,000. The population was about 150,000 in 1600 AD, and almost 200,000 in 1700 AD.

The Lisbon metropolitan area incorporates two NUTS III (European statistical subdivisions): Grande Lisboa (Greater Lisbon), along the northern bank of the Tagus River, and Península de Setúbal (Setúbal Peninsula), along the southern bank. These two subdivisions make for the Região de Lisboa (Lisbon Region).

Lisbon has 544,851 inhabitants within the administrative center on the area of only 100.05 km2 Administratively defined cities that exist in the vicinity of the capital are in fact part of the metropolitan perimeter of Lisbon. The urban area has a population of 2,666,000 inhabitants, being the eleventh largest urban area in the European Union. The whole metropolis of Lisbon (metropolitan area) has about 3 million inhabitants. According to official government data, the Lisbon metropolitan area has 3,643,876 inhabitants. 

Other sources also show a similar number, according to the Organisation for Economic Co-operation and Development – 2,797,612 inhabitants; according to the Department of Economic and Social Affairs of the United Nations – 2,890,000; according to the European Statistical Office Eurostat – 2,839,908; according to the Brookings Institution has 2,968,600 inhabitants.

Economy

The Lisbon region is the wealthiest region in Portugal and it is well above the European Union's GDP per capita average – it produces 45% of the Portuguese GDP. Lisbon's economy is based primarily on the tertiary sector. Most of the headquarters of multinationals operating in Portugal are concentrated in the Grande Lisboa Subregion, especially in the Oeiras municipality. The Lisbon metropolitan area is heavily industrialized, especially the south bank of the Tagus river (Rio Tejo).

The Lisbon region is rapidly growing, with GDP (PPP) per capita calculated for each year as follows: €22,745 (2004) – €23,816 (2005) – €25,200 (2006) – €26,100 (2007). The Lisbon metropolitan area had a GDP amounting to $110.4 billion, and $32,434 per capita.

The country's chief seaport, featuring one of the largest and most sophisticated regional markets on the Iberian Peninsula, Lisbon and its heavily populated surroundings are also developing as an important financial centre and a dynamic technological hub. Automobile manufacturers have erected factories in the suburbs, for example, AutoEuropa.

Lisbon has the largest and most developed mass media sector of Portugal and is home to several related companies ranging from leading television networks and radio stations to major newspapers.

The Euronext Lisbon stock exchange, part of the pan-European Euronext system together with the stock exchanges of Amsterdam, Brussels and Paris, is tied with the New York Stock Exchange since 2007, forming the multinational NYSE Euronext group of stock exchanges.

The lisbonite industry has very large sectors in oil, as refineries are found just across the Tagus, textile mills, shipyards and fishing.

Before Portugal's sovereign debt crisis and an EU-IMF rescue plan, for the decade of 2010 Lisbon was expecting to receive many state-funded investments, including building a new airport, a new bridge, an expansion of the Lisbon Metro  underground, the construction of a mega-hospital (or central hospital), the creation of two lines of a TGV to join Madrid, Porto, Vigo and the rest of Europe, the restoration of the main part of the town (between the Marquês de Pombal roundabout and Terreiro do Paço), the creation of a large number of bike lanes, as well as modernization and renovation of various facilities.

Lisbon was the 7th most "livable city" in the world in 2021 according to lifestyle magazine Monocle.

Tourism is also a significant industry; a 2018 report stated that the city receives an average of 4.5 million tourists per year. Hotel revenues alone generated €714.8 million in 2017, an increase of 18.7% over 2016.

Lisbon was elected the "World's Leading City Destination and World's Leading City Break Destination 2018".

Transport

Metro

The Lisbon Metro connects the city centre with the upper and eastern districts, and also reaches some suburbs that are part of the Lisbon metropolitan area, such as Amadora and Loures. It is the fastest way to get around the city and it provides a good number of interchanging stations with other types of transportation. From the Lisbon Airport station to the city centre it may take roughly 25 mins. In 2019, the Lisbon Metro served around 173 million passengers (and 475.000 daily). As of 2018, the Lisbon Metro comprises four lines, identified by individual colours (blue, yellow, green and red) and 56 stations, with a total length of 44.2 km. Several expansion projects have been proposed, being the most recent the transformation of the Green Line into a circular line and the creation of two more stations (Santos and Estrela).

Trams

A traditional form of public transport in Lisbon is the tram. Introduced in 1901, electric trams were originally imported from the US, and called the americanos. The earliest trams can still be seen in the Museu da Carris (the Public Transport Museum). Other than on the modern Line 15, the Lisbon tramway system still employs small (four-wheel) vehicles of a design dating from the early twentieth century. These distinctive yellow trams are one of the tourist icons of modern Lisbon, and their size is well suited to the steep hills and narrow streets of the central city.

Trains

There are four commuter train lines departing from Lisbon: the Sintra, Azambuja, Cascais and Sado lines (operated by CP – Comboios de Portugal), as well as a fifth line to Setúbal (operated by Fertagus), which crosses the Tagus river via the 25 de Abril Bridge. The major railway stations are Santa Apolónia, Rossio, Gare do Oriente, Entrecampos, and Cais do Sodré.

Buses
The local bus service within Lisbon is operated by Carris.

Outside Lisbon, there is two main commuter bus services connecting the cities outside Lisbon, and connecting these cities to Lisbon: Carris Metropolitana, a brand operated by 4 companies, all operating inside the Lisbon Metropolitan Area, and Barraqueiro Transportes (with 4 brands operating outside the Metropolitan Area with services to Lisbon), are the main ones, operating from different terminals in the city.

Lisbon is connected to its suburbs and throughout Portugal by an extensive motorway network. There are three circular motorways around the city; the 2ª Circular, the IC17 (CRIL), and the A9 (CREL).

Bridges and ferries

The city is connected to the far side of the Tagus by two important bridges:
The 25 de Abril Bridge, inaugurated (as Ponte Salazar) on 6 August 1966, and later renamed after the date of the Carnation Revolution, was the longest suspension bridge in Europe.

The foundations for a third bridge across the Tagus have already been laid, but the overall project has been postponed due to the economic crisis in Portugal and all of Europe.

Another way of crossing the river is by taking the ferry. The operator is Transtejo & Soflusa, which runs from different locations within the city: Cacilhas, Seixal, Montijo, Porto Brandão and Trafaria under the brand Transtejo and to Barreiro under the brand Soflusa.

Air travel
Humberto Delgado Airport is located within the city limits. It is the headquarters and hub for TAP Portugal as well as a hub for Easyjet, Azores Airlines, Ryanair, EuroAtlantic Airways, White Airways, and Hi Fly. A second airport has been proposed, but the project has been put on hold because of the Portuguese and European economic crisis, and also because of the long discussion on whether a new airport is needed. However, the last proposal is a military airbase in Montijo that would be replaced by a civil airport. So, Lisbon would have two airports, the current airport in the north and a new one in the south of the city.

Cascais Aerodrome, 20 km West of the city centre, in Cascais, offers commercial domestic flights.

Cycling

Following the Covid-19 pandemic, Lisbon has seen a significant increase in cycling and plans to expand the current Gira bike hire system from 600 bikes to 1,500 by summer 2021. Many of these bikes will be electric to deal with Lisbon's hills. The city will also expand its network of cycle paths.

Public transportation statistics
The average amount of time people spend commuting with public transit in Lisbon, for example to and from work, on a weekday is 59 min. 11.5% of public transit riders, ride for more than 2 hours every day. The average amount of time people wait at a stop or station for public transit is 14 min, while 23.1% of riders wait for over 20 minutes on average every day. The average distance people usually ride in a single trip with public transit is 6 km, while 10% travel for over 12 km in a single direction.

Education

International schools
In Greater Lisbon area, particularly in the Portuguese Riviera, an area popular with expats and foreign nationals, there are numerous international schools, including the Carlucci American International School of Lisbon (only American school in Portugal), Saint Julian's School (British), Saint Dominic's International School (British), Deutsche Schule Lissabon (German), Instituto Español Giner de los Ríos (Spanish), and Lycée Français Charles Lepierre (French).

Higher education

In the city, there are three public universities and a university institute. The University of Lisbon, which is the largest university in Portugal, was created in 2013 with the union of the Technical University of Lisbon and the Classical University of Lisbon (which was known as the University of Lisbon). The New University of Lisbon, founded in 1973, is another public university in Lisbon and is known internationally by its Nova School of Business and Economics (Nova SBE), its economics and management faculty. The third public university is Universidade Aberta. Additionally, there's ISCTE - Lisbon University Institute (founded in 1972), a university institute that provides degrees in all academic disciplines.

Major private institutions of higher education include the Portuguese Catholic University, focused on law and management, as well as the Lusíada University, the Universidade Lusófona, and the Universidade Autónoma de Lisboa, among others.

The total number of enrolled students in higher education in Lisbon was, for the 2007–2008 school year, of 125,867 students, of whom 81,507 in the Lisbon's public institutions.

Libraries
Lisbon is home to Biblioteca Nacional de Portugal, the Portuguese national library, which has over 3 million books and manuscripts. The library has some rare books and manuscripts, such as an original Gutenberg Bible and original books by Erasmus, Christophe Platin and Aldus Manutius. Torre do Tombo, the national archive, is one of the most important archives in the world, with over 600 years and one of the oldest active Portuguese institutions. There are, among several others, the Arquivo Histórico Ultramarino and the Arquivo Histórico Militar.

Sports

Lisbon has a long tradition in sports. It hosted several matches, including the final, of the UEFA Euro 2004 championship. The city also played host to the final of the 2001 IAAF World Indoor Championships and the European Fencing Championships in 1983 and 1992, as well as the 2003 World Men's Handball Championship, and the 2008 European Judo Championships. From 2006 to 2008, Lisbon was the starting point for the Dakar Rally. The city hosted the 2014 and 2020 UEFA Champions League finals. In 2008 and 2016, the city hosted the European Triathlon Championships. Lisbon has a leg at the Volvo Ocean Race.

Football
The city hosts three association football clubs in Portugal's highest league, the Primeira Liga. Sport Lisboa e Benfica, commonly known as simply Benfica, has won 37 league titles in addition to two European Cups. Lisbon's second-most successful club is Sporting Clube de Portugal (commonly known as Sporting and often referred to as Sporting Lisbon abroad to prevent confusion with other teams with the same name), winner of 19 league titles and the UEFA Cup Winners' Cup. A third club, C.F. Os Belenenses (commonly Belenenses or Belenenses Lisbon), based in the Belém quarter, has solely won one league title. Other major clubs in Lisbon include Atlético, Casa Pia, and Oriental.

Lisbon has two UEFA category four stadiums; Benfica's Estádio da Luz (Stadium of Light), with a capacity of over 65,000 and Sporting's Estádio José Alvalade, with a capacity of over 50,000. The Estádio da Luz held both the 2014 and 2020 UEFA Champions League Final. There is also Belenenses' Estádio do Restelo, with a capacity of over 30,000. The Estádio Nacional, in nearby Oeiras, has a capacity of 37,000 and was used exclusively for Portuguese international football matches and cup finals until the construction of larger stadia in the city. It held the 1967 European Cup Final.

Other sports
Other sports, such as basketball, futsal, handball, roller hockey, rugby union and volleyball are also popular; the latter's national stadium is in Lisbon. There are many other sports facilities in Lisbon, ranging from athletics, sailing, golfing to mountain-biking. Lisboa and Troia golf course are two of many stunning golf courses located in Lisbon. Every March the city hosts the Lisbon Half Marathon, while in September the Portugal Half Marathon.

International relations

Twin towns – sister cities

Lisbon is twinned with:

 Bissau, Guinea-Bissau (1985)
 Budapest, Hungary (1992)
 Cacheu, Guinea-Bissau (1988)
 Fortaleza, Brazil (2016)
 Guimarães, Portugal (1993)
 Luanda, Angola (1988)
 Macau, China (1982)
 Madrid, Spain (1979)
 Malacca City, Malaysia (1984)
 Maputo, Mozambique (1982)
 Praia, Cape Verde (1983)
 Rabat, Morocco (1988)
 Rio de Janeiro, Brazil (1980)
 Salvador, Brazil (1995)
 São Tomé, São Tomé and Príncipe (1985)

Cooperation agreements
Lisbon has additional cooperation agreements with:

 Algiers, Algeria (1988)
 Asunción, Paraguay (2014)
 Bangkok, Thailand (2016)
 Beijing, China (2007)
 Bethlehem, Palestine (1995)
 Buenos Aires, Argentina (1992)
 Curitiba, Brazil (2005)
 Haimen, China (2011)
 Kyiv, Ukraine (2000)
 Miami, United States (1987)
 Montevideo, Uruguay (1993)
 Panaji, India (1989)
 Paris, France (1998)
 Qingdao, China (2010)
 Santa Catarina, Cape Verde (1997)
 Sofia, Bulgaria (2001)
 Toronto, Canada (1987)
 Tunis, Tunisia (1993)
 Zagreb, Croatia (1977)

Membership in organizations
From 12 October 1982, Lisbon is part of the Union of Ibero-American Capital Cities.

From 28 June 1985, Lisbon is part of the Union of Capital Cities of Portuguese Language, alongside with 22 other cities from Angola, Brazil, Cape Verde, China, East Timor, Guinea-Bissau, Mozambique, Portugal, and São Tomé and Príncipe.

See also

List of people from Lisbon
List of tallest buildings in Lisbon

References

Further reading

External links

Visit Portugal – Official page by the Government of Portugal
Associação de Turismo de Lisboa – Official site of the Lisbon Tourism Association
OTLIS – Official site of the Lisbon Region Transport Operators Consortium
Portal das Nações Official site of Parque das Nações in Lisbon
Lisbon voted European City of the Year 2012 – Award – Portuguese American Journal
TVL Lisbon TV

 
Capitals in Europe
Cities in Portugal
Marinas in Portugal
Phoenician colonies in Portugal
Populated coastal places in Portugal
Populated places in Lisbon District
Port cities and towns in Portugal
Recipients of the Order of the Tower and Sword
Roman towns and cities in Portugal
Municipalities of Lisbon District
Populated places established in the 2nd millennium BC
2nd-millennium BC establishments